Scharrel (Saterland Frisian: Skäddel) is a village and former municipality in the German state of Lower Saxony. In 1974 the until then independent municipality became part of the newly formed municipality of Saterland in the District of Cloppenburg.

References

External links 
 Official municipality site 

Cloppenburg (district)
Villages in Lower Saxony